Edwin Daniel (1981–2008) was a Mexican artist, painter and illustrator.  He graduated in Graphic Communication Design at UAM Azcapotzalco.  His artistic style is pop art, and his major influences were Andy Warhol and Jean-Michel Basquiat.

Awards
 V Visual Arts Award Emilia Ortiz of Nayarit State Government (May 2005).

Exhibitions

Group show
9th ANNUAL MERMAID SHOW. Sideshow Gallery. New York. (July 2006)

Solo exhibitions
Man masks. BProud Gallery. Mexico City. (July–August 2004)
La Chanson de Roland. Interlomas French Alliance. Huixquilucan. (March–April 2005)
Happy End of the World. Culture House Romero Flores. Mexico City. (April 2005)
Works. Aramara Visual Arts Museum. Tepic. (April–May 2005)
Defying gravity. UNITEC Campus Zapopan. Zapopan. (October–November 2005)
Tempus Fugit. Culture House Romero Flores. Mexico City. (April–May 2006)
The time fugitive. INIZZIO Gallery. Mexico City. (May–June 2006)
Birthday. Contempo Cinema. Mexico City. (September 2006)
Version 2.0. Journalists Club. Mexico City. (October 2006)
The world exists for me. Bookseller Gandhi Opportunities. Mexico City. (January–February 2007)
Vinyl. Representation of Nayarit. Mexico City. (February–May 2007)
Horacio Franco by Edwin Daniel. Representation of Nayarit. Mexico City. (May 2007)
VLA Show. Centennial Regional Park, Santa Ana, California, USA. (August 2007)
The Songbook. Mexican Consulate. Santa Ana, California. U.S.. (October–November 2007)
Pop Mart. Museum of the SHCP . Mexico City. (December 2007)
"Part of the month." Galeria Jose Maria Velazco National Institute of Fine Arts (January–February 2008)
"Everything but the Kitschen Sync" La Luz De Jesus Gallery Los Angeles California, (March 2008)

1981 births
2008 deaths
Place of birth missing
20th-century Mexican painters
Mexican male painters
20th-century Mexican male artists